Haftkel (also Romanized as Haftgel) is a city and capital of Haftgel County, Khuzestan Province, Iran.  At the 2006 census, its population was 14,735, in 3,153 families.

References

Populated places in Haftkel County

Cities in Khuzestan Province